Remilson  Nery  (born 31 March 1961) is a Brazilian composer and musician.

Early life
The third of four boys, Remilson Santos Nery was born on March 31, 1961 in Rio de Janeiro, Brazil. Remilson Nery spent his entire childhood in Irajá, a working-class district of north Rio. At an early age, he began his music education (guitar and music theory) with a professional guitarist and a religious sister fascinated by Brazilian traditional and classical music. From 1971 to 1978, without his parents' permission, Remilson Nery played in the percussion orchestra of Portela samba school.

From 1973–79, Nery studied classical guitar with Leo Soares, Mario Jorge Passos and Dorival Lessa at the Villa-Lobos Music School in Rio,  He also studied music theory, harmony, music history, counterpoint and composition with composer César Guerra-Peixe. From 1981–86, Nery completed his Bachelor of Music Therapy at the Conservatório Brasileiro de Música in Rio de Janeiro.

Career
From 1971 to 2010, Nery performed several concerts (classical, pop and world music) as a soloist and a chamber musician (classical or electric guitarist) across Brazil, Argentina, Chile, United States and Japan. During 1980-1983, he worked as an arranger for Polydor Record Brazil. Nery continued to write and publish classical music, such as ten pieces for classical guitar that were inspired by personal events, and published in 2015.

References

External links
 http://www.anotherear.com/remilsonnery.html
 http://www.kazu-classicalguitar.co.uk/blog/content/classical-guitar-composers-compendium-interview-remilson-nery-france
 http://latinamericancomposers.com/remilson-nery/

1961 births
Brazilian male composers
Brazilian guitarists
Brazilian male guitarists
Living people
20th-century male musicians
21st-century male musicians